Ranjith Kanishka Parakrama Atapattu (29 April 1933 – 8 January 2018) was a Sri Lankan physician and politician.

Biography

Ranjith Kanishka Parakrama Atapattu was born 29 April 1933 in Tangalle, the son of Don Peter (Member of Parliament for Beliatta and Parliamentary Secretary to the Cabinet Minister of State).  He was educated at Royal College Colombo and the University of Ceylon, between 1954 and 1960, where he obtained a Bachelor of Medicine and Bachelor of Surgery. Atapattu was employed as Medical Officer between 1960 and 1966, before establishing his own general medical practice.

Atapattu was first elected to parliament at the 8th parliamentary elections in July 1977, representing the United National Party in the Beliatta electorate, where he defeated the sitting member, Mahinda Rajapaksa, by over 6,000 votes. President J. R. Jayewardene, reluctant to give up the massive majority his party secured in 1977, held a referendum to cancel the 1983 parliamentary elections, and extend the life of the 1977 parliament until 1989. Jayewardene also decreed that all United National Party parliamentarians, whose electoral districts had not supported the referendum, would have to run in a by-election.  Atapattu resigned from his seat 10 February 1983 but was subsequently successful in the May 1983 by-elections, defeating Rajapaska by nearly 3,000 votes.

Atapattu was appointed the Minister for Colombo Group of Hospitals (a project Ministry under the Ministry of Health) in August 1978.  He was then appointed the Minister of Health in the Jayewardene cabinet in 1982 and held the position until 1989. At the 1989 parliamentary elections he ran as the United National Party candidate in the Hambantota electorate and was duly elected with 10,381 preference votes (18.35%), behind Rajapkasa's 13,073 preference votes (23.11%).  In 18 February 1989 Atapattu was appointed Minister of Labour and Social Welfare as part of the Premadasa cabinet and held the position until 5 January 1990.

See also
List of political families in Sri Lanka

References

1933 births
Sri Lankan Buddhists
Alumni of Royal College, Colombo
2018 deaths
Sinhalese physicians
Members of the 8th Parliament of Sri Lanka
Health ministers of Sri Lanka
Members of the 9th Parliament of Sri Lanka
Non-cabinet ministers of Sri Lanka
Labour ministers of Sri Lanka
Social affairs ministers of Sri Lanka